Peter William Sutcliffe (2 June 1946 – 13 November 2020), also known as Peter Coonan and dubbed in press reports as the Yorkshire Ripper (an allusion to Jack the Ripper) was an English serial killer who was convicted of murdering thirteen women and attempting to murder seven others between 1975 and 1980. He was sentenced to twenty concurrent sentences of life imprisonment, which were converted to a whole life order in 2010. Two of Sutcliffe's murders took place in Manchester; all the others were in West Yorkshire.

Sutcliffe initially attacked women and girls in residential areas, but appears to have shifted his focus to red-light districts because he was attracted by the vulnerability of prostitutes and the perceived ambivalent attitude, at the time, of police to prostitutes' safety. After his arrest in Sheffield by South Yorkshire Police for driving with false number plates in January 1981, he was transferred to the custody of West Yorkshire Police, which questioned him about the killings. Sutcliffe confessed to being the perpetrator, saying that the voice of God had sent him on a mission to kill prostitutes. At his trial he pleaded not guilty to murder on grounds of diminished responsibility, but he was convicted of murder on a majority verdict. Following his conviction, Sutcliffe began using his mother's maiden name of Coonan.

The search for Sutcliffe was one of the largest and most expensive manhunts in British history, and West Yorkshire Police was criticised for its failure to catch him despite having interviewed him nine times in the course of its five-year investigation. Owing to the sensational nature of the case, the police handled an exceptional amount of information, some of it misleading (including hoax correspondence purporting to be from the "Ripper"). Following Sutcliffe's conviction, the government ordered a review of the investigation, conducted by the Inspector of Constabulary Lawrence Byford, known as the "Byford Report". The findings were made fully public in 2006, and confirmed the validity of the criticism of the force. The report led to changes to investigative procedures that were adopted across UK police forces. Since his conviction in 1981 Sutcliffe has been linked to a number of other unsolved murders and attacks.

Sutcliffe was transferred from prison to Broadmoor Hospital in March 1984 after being diagnosed with paranoid schizophrenia. The High Court dismissed an appeal by Sutcliffe in 2010, confirming that he would serve a whole life order and never be released from custody. In August 2016, it was ruled that he was mentally fit to be returned to prison, and he was transferred that month to HM Prison Frankland in County Durham. Sutcliffe died from diabetes-related complications in hospital, while in prison custody on 13 November 2020, at the age of 74.

Early life 
Peter Sutcliffe was born to a working-class family in Bingley, West Riding of Yorkshire. His parents were John William Sutcliffe and his wife Kathleen Frances (née Coonan), a native of Connemara. Kathleen was a Roman Catholic and John was a member of the choir at the local Anglican church of St Wilfred's; their children were raised in their mother's Catholic faith, and Sutcliffe briefly served as an altar boy. 

Through his childhood and his early adolescence, Sutcliffe showed no signs of abnormality. One of his brothers admitted that their father was an abusive alcoholic, stating that he once smashed a beer glass over Sutcliffe's head for sitting in his chair at the Christmas table, after arguing, when the brother was four or five years old. Their father would also whip his children with a belt. In his late adolescence, Sutcliffe developed a growing obsession with voyeurism, and spent much time spying on prostitutes and the men seeking their services.

Reportedly a loner, Sutcliffe left school at age 15 and had a series of menial jobs, including two stints as a gravedigger in the 1960s. Because of this occupation, he developed a macabre sense of humour. Between November 1971 and April 1973, Sutcliffe worked at the Baird Television factory on a packaging line. He left this position when he was asked to go on the road as a salesman.

After leaving Baird Television, Sutcliffe worked nightshifts at the Britannia Works of Anderton International from April 1973. In February 1975, he took redundancy and used half of the £400 pay-off to train as a heavy goods vehicle (HGV) driver. On 5 March 1976, Sutcliffe was dismissed for the theft of used tyres. He was unemployed until October 1976, when he found a job as an HGV driver for T. & W.H. Clark (Holdings) Ltd. on the Canal Road Industrial Estate in Bradford.

Sutcliffe reportedly hired prostitutes as a young man, and it has been speculated that he had a bad experience during which he was conned out of money by a prostitute and her pimp. Other analyses of his actions have not found evidence that he actually sought the services of prostitutes but note that he nonetheless developed an obsession with them, including "watching them soliciting on the streets of Leeds and Bradford".

Sutcliffe met Sonia Szurma on 14 February 1967; they married on 10 August 1974. Sonia had several miscarriages, and they were informed that she would not be able to have children. She resumed a teacher training course, during which time she had an affair with an ice-cream van driver. When Sonia completed the course in 1977 and began teaching, she and Sutcliffe used her salary to buy a house at 6 Garden Lane in Heaton, into which they moved on 26 September 1977, and where they were living at the time of Sutcliffe's arrest.

Attacks and murders 
Leeds was the epicentre of Ripper activity, with six murders and five attacks in the city. Sutcliffe's first and last murders also occurred in Leeds. The following is a summary of Sutcliffe's confirmed crimes:

Sutcliffe's thirteen known murder victims were Wilma McCann (Leeds 1975), Emily Jackson (Leeds 1976), Irene Richardson (Leeds 1977), Patricia "Tina" Atkinson (Bradford 1977), Jayne MacDonald (Leeds 1977), Jean Jordan (Manchester 1977), Yvonne Pearson (Bradford 1978), Helen Rytka (Huddersfield 1978), Vera Millward (Manchester 1978), Josephine Whitaker (Halifax 1979), Barbara Leach (Bradford 1979), Marguerite Walls (Leeds 1980) and Jacqueline Hill (Leeds 1980). 

Sutcliffe is also known to have attacked eleven other women: a woman of unknown name (Bradford 1969), Anna Rogulskyj (Keighley 1975), Olive Smelt (Halifax 1975), Tracy Browne (Silsden 1975), Marcella Claxton (Leeds 1976), Maureen Long (Bradford 1977) Marilyn Moore (Leeds 1977), Ann Rooney (Leeds 1979) Upadhya Bandara (Leeds 1980), Mo Lea (Leeds 1980) and Theresa Sykes (Huddersfield 1980). Claxton was four months pregnant when she was attacked, and lost the baby she was carrying.

1969 
Sutcliffe's first documented assault was of a female prostitute, whom he had met while searching for another woman who had tricked him out of money. He left his friend Trevor Birdsall's minivan and walked up St. Paul's Road in Bradford until he was out of sight. When Sutcliffe returned, he was out of breath, as if he had been running; he told Birdsall to drive off quickly. Sutcliffe said he had followed a prostitute into a garage and hit her over the head with a stone in a sock. According to his statement, Sutcliffe said, "I got out of the car, went across the road and hit her. The force of the impact tore the toe off the sock and whatever was in it came out. I went back to the car and got in it".

Police visited Sutcliffe's home the next day, as the woman he had attacked had noted Birdsall's vehicle registration plate. Sutcliffe admitted he had hit her, but claimed it was with his hand. The police told him he was "very lucky", as the woman did not want anything more to do with the incident.

1975 
Sutcliffe committed his second assault on the night of 5 July 1975 in Keighley. He attacked Anna Rogulskyj, who was walking alone, striking her unconscious with a hammer and slashing her stomach with a knife. Disturbed by a neighbour, he left without killing her. Rogulskyj survived after neurological surgery but she was psychologically traumatised by the attack. She later said, "I've been afraid to go out much because I feel people are staring and pointing at me. The whole thing is making my life a misery. I sometimes wish I had died in the attack."

On the night of 15 August, Sutcliffe attacked Olive Smelt in Halifax. Employing the same modus operandi, he briefly engaged Smelt with a commonplace pleasantry about the weather before striking hammer blows to her skull from behind. He then disarranged her clothing and slashed her lower back with a knife. Again he was interrupted and left his victim badly injured but alive. Like Rogulskyj, Smelt subsequently suffered severe emotional and mental trauma. Smelt later told Detective Superintendent Dick Holland (later the Ripper Squad's second in command) that her attacker had a Yorkshire accent but this information was ignored, as was the fact that neither she nor Rogulskij were in towns with a red light area. 

On 27 August, Sutcliffe targeted 14-year-old Tracy Browne in Silsden, attacking her from behind and hitting her on the head five times while she was walking along a country lane. He ran off when he saw the lights of a passing car, leaving his victim requiring brain surgery. Sutcliffe was not convicted of the attack but confessed in 1992.

The first victim to be killed by Sutcliffe was Wilma McCann on 30 October. McCann, from Scott Hall, Leeds, was a mother of four children between the ages of 2 and 7. Sutcliffe struck the back of her skull twice with a hammer, then inflicted "a stab wound to the throat; two stab wounds below the right breast; three stab wounds below the left breast and a series of nine stab wounds around the umbilicus". An extensive inquiry, involving 150 officers of the West Yorkshire Police and 11,000 interviews, failed to find the culprit. In December 2007, McCann's eldest daughter Sonia Newlands died by suicide, reportedly after years of anguish and depression over the circumstances of her mother's death, and consequences to her and her siblings.

1976 
Sutcliffe committed his next murder in Leeds on 20 January 1976, when he stabbed 42-year-old Emily Jackson fifty-two times. In dire financial straits, Jackson had been persuaded by her husband to engage in prostitution, using the van of their family roofing business. Sutcliffe picked up Jackson, who was soliciting outside the Gaiety pub on Roundhay Road, then drove about half a mile to some derelict buildings on Enfield Terrace in the Manor Industrial Estate. Sutcliffe hit her on the head with a hammer, dragged her body into a rubbish-strewn yard, then used a sharpened screwdriver to stab her in the neck, chest and abdomen. He stamped on her thigh, leaving behind an impression of his boot.

Sutcliffe attacked 20-year-old Marcella Claxton in Roundhay Park, Leeds, on 9 May. Walking home from a party, she accepted an offer of a lift from Sutcliffe. When she got out of the car to urinate, he hit her from behind with a hammer. Claxton survived and testified against Sutcliffe at his trial. At the time of this attack, Claxton had been four months pregnant and subsequently miscarried her baby. She required multiple, extensive brain operations and had intermittent blackouts and chronic depression.

1977 
On 5 February, Sutcliffe attacked Irene Richardson, a Chapeltown prostitute, in Roundhay Park. Richardson was bludgeoned to death with a hammer. Once she was dead, Sutcliffe mutilated her corpse with a knife. Tyre tracks left near the murder scene resulted in a long list of possible suspect vehicles.

Two months later, on 23 April, Sutcliffe killed Patricia "Tina" Atkinson, a prostitute in her Bradford flat, where police found a bootprint on the bedclothes. Two months after that, on 26 June, he murdered 16-year-old Jayne MacDonald in Chapeltown. MacDonald was not a prostitute and, in the public perception, her murder showed that all women were potential victims. The police described her as the first "innocent" victim. The following month, Sutcliffe assaulted Maureen Long in Bradford, but was interrupted and left her for dead. Long was suffering from hypothermia when found and was in hospital for nine weeks. A witness misidentified the make of Sutcliffe's car, resulting in more than 300 police officers checking thousands of cars without success.

On 1 October 1977 Sutcliffe murdered Jean Jordan, a prostitute from Manchester. In a later confession, Sutcliffe said he had realised the new £5 note he had given to Jordan was traceable. After hosting a family party at his new home, he returned to the wasteland behind Manchester's Southern Cemetery, where he had left the body, but failed to retrieve the note.

On 9 October, Jordan's body was discovered by local dairy worker and future actor Bruce Jones, who had an allotment on land adjoining the site and was searching for house bricks when he made the discovery. The £5 note, hidden in a secret compartment in Jordan's handbag, was traced to branches of the Midland Bank in Shipley and Bingley. Police analysis of bank operations allowed them to narrow their field of inquiry to 8,000 employees who could have received it in their wage packet. Over three months the police interviewed 5,000 men, including Sutcliffe. The police found that the alibi given for Sutcliffe's whereabouts, that he had attended a family party, was credible. Weeks of intense investigations pertaining to the origins of the £5 note led to nothing, leaving investigators frustrated that they collected an important clue but had been unable to trace the actual firm (or employee within the firm) to which or whom the note had been issued.

On 14 December, Sutcliffe attacked Marilyn Moore, another prostitute from Leeds. She survived and provided police with a description of her attacker. Tyre tracks found at the scene matched those from an earlier attack. The resulting photofit bore a strong resemblance to Sutcliffe, as had those from other survivors, and Moore provided a good description of Sutcliffe's car, which had been seen in red light areas. Sutcliffe had been interviewed on this issue.

1978 
The police discontinued the search for the person who received the £5 note in January 1978. Although Sutcliffe was interviewed about it, he was not investigated further (he was contacted and disregarded by the Ripper Squad on several further occasions). That month, Sutcliffe killed Yvonne Pearson, a 21-year-old prostitute from Bradford. He repeatedly bludgeoned her about the head with a ball-peen hammer, then jumped on her chest before stuffing horsehair into her mouth from a discarded sofa, under which he hid her body near Lumb Lane.

Ten days later, Sutcliffe killed Helen Rytka, an 18-year-old prostitute from Huddersfield, striking on the head five times as she exited his vehicle before stripping most of the clothes from her body (although her bra and polo-neck jumper were positioned above her breasts) and repeatedly stabbing her in the chest. Her body was found three days later beneath railway arches in Garrards timber-yard, to which he had driven her. Sutcliffe said of Rytka while in police custody in 1981: "I had the urge to kill any woman. The urge inside me to kill girls was now practically uncontrollable."

1979 
On 4 April 1979, Sutcliffe killed Josephine Whitaker, a 19-year-old clerk whom he attacked on Savile Park Moor in Halifax as she was walking home. Despite forensic evidence, police efforts were diverted for several months following receipt of the taped message purporting to be from the murderer taunting Assistant Chief Constable George Oldfield of the West Yorkshire Police, who was leading the investigation. The tape contained a man's voice saying, "I'm Jack. I see you're having no luck catching me. I have the greatest respect for you, George, but Lord, you're no nearer catching me now than four years ago when I started."

Based on the recorded message, police began searching for a man with a Wearside accent, which linguists narrowed down to the Castletown area of Sunderland, Tyne and Wear. The hoaxer, dubbed "Wearside Jack", sent two letters to police and the Daily Mirror in March 1978 boasting of his crimes. The letters, signed "Jack the Ripper", claimed responsibility for the murder of 26-year-old Joan Harrison in Preston in November 1975.

The hoaxer case was re-opened in 2005, and DNA taken from envelopes was entered into the national database. The DNA matched that of John Samuel Humble, an unemployed alcoholic and longtime resident of the Ford Estate in Sunderland – a few miles from Castletown – whose DNA had been taken following a drunk and disorderly offence in 2001. On 20 October 2005, Humble was charged with attempting to pervert the course of justice for sending the hoax letters and tape. He was remanded in custody and on 21 March 2006 was convicted and sentenced to eight years in prison. Humble died on 30 July 2019, aged 63.

On 1 September, Sutcliffe murdered 20-year-old Barbara Leach, a Bradford University student. Her body was dumped at the rear of 13 Ashgrove under a pile of bricks, close to the university and her lodgings. The murder of a woman who was not a prostitute again alarmed the public and prompted an expensive publicity campaign emphasising the Wearside connection. Despite the false lead, Sutcliffe was interviewed on at least two other occasions in 1979. Despite matching several forensic clues and being on the list of 300 names in connection with the £5 note, he was not strongly suspected.

1980 
In April 1980, Sutcliffe was arrested for drunk driving. While awaiting trial, he killed two more women: 47-year-old Marguerite Walls on the night of 20 August 1980, and 20-year-old Jacqueline Hill, a student at Leeds University, on the night of 17 November 1980. He also attacked three other women, who survived: Uphadya Bandara in Leeds on 24 September 1980; Maureen Lea (known as Mo), an art student attacked in the grounds of Leeds University on 25 October 1980; and 16-year-old Theresa Sykes, attacked in Huddersfield on the night of 5 November 1980. On 25 November 1980, Trevor Birdsall, an associate of Sutcliffe and the unwitting getaway driver in his first documented assault in 1969, reported him to the police as a suspect. In total, Sutcliffe had been questioned by the police on nine separate occasions in connection with the Ripper enquiry before his eventual arrest and conviction.

Arrest and trial 

On 2 January 1981, Sutcliffe was stopped by the police with 24-year-old prostitute Olivia Reivers in the driveway of Light Trades House in Melbourne Avenue, Broomhill, Sheffield, South Yorkshire. A police check by probationary constable Robert Hydes revealed Sutcliffe's car had false number plates; he was arrested and transferred to Dewsbury police station in West Yorkshire. At Dewsbury, Sutcliffe was questioned in relation to the Ripper case as he matched many of the known physical characteristics. The next day investigators returned to the scene of the arrest and discovered a knife, hammer, and rope he had discarded when he briefly slipped away after telling police he was "bursting for a pee". Sutcliffe hid a second knife in the toilet cistern at the police station when he was permitted to use the toilet. The police obtained a search warrant for his home in Heaton and brought his wife in for questioning.

When Sutcliffe was stripped at Dewsbury police station he was wearing an inverted V-necked jumper under his trousers. The sleeves had been pulled over his legs and the V-neck exposed his genital area. The fronts of the elbows were padded to protect his knees as, presumably, he knelt over his victims' corpses. The sexual implications of this outfit were considered obvious but it was not known to the public until published in 2003. 

After two days of intensive questioning, on the afternoon of 4 January 1981, Sutcliffe suddenly declared he was the Yorkshire Ripper. Over the next day, he calmly described his many attacks. Weeks later he claimed God had told him to murder the women. "The women I killed were filth", he told police. "Bastard prostitutes who were littering the streets. I was just cleaning up the place a bit". Sutcliffe displayed regret only when talking of his youngest murder victim, Jayne MacDonald, and when questioned about the killing of Joan Harrison, he vehemently denied responsibility. Harrison's murder had been linked to the Ripper killings by the "Wearside Jack" claim, but in 2011 DNA evidence revealed the crime had actually been committed by convicted sex offender Christopher Smith, who had died in 2008.

Sutcliffe was charged on 5 January 1981. At his trial, he pleaded not guilty to thirteen charges of murder, but guilty to manslaughter on the grounds of diminished responsibility. The basis of his defence was that he claimed to be the tool of God's will. Sutcliffe said he had heard voices that ordered him to kill prostitutes while working as a gravedigger, which he claimed originated from the headstone of a Polish man, Bronisław Zapolski, and that the voices were that of God.

Sutcliffe pleaded guilty to seven charges of attempted murder. The prosecution intended to accept his plea after four psychiatrists diagnosed him with paranoid schizophrenia, but the trial judge, Justice Sir Leslie Boreham, demanded an unusually detailed explanation of the prosecution's reasoning. After a two-hour representation by the Attorney-General Sir Michael Havers, a ninety-minute lunch break, and another forty minutes of legal discussion, the judge rejected the diminished responsibility plea and the expert testimonies of the psychiatrists, insisting that the case should be dealt with by a jury. The trial proper was set to commence on 5 May 1981.

The trial lasted two weeks, and despite the efforts of his counsel James Chadwin QC, Sutcliffe was found guilty of murder on all counts and was sentenced to twenty concurrent sentences of life imprisonment. The jury rejected the evidence of four psychiatrists who gave testimony that Sutcliffe had paranoid schizophrenia, possibly influenced by the evidence of a prison officer who heard him say to his wife that if he convinced people he was mad then he might get ten years in a "loony bin".

Justice Boreham stated that Sutcliffe was beyond redemption, and hoped he would never leave prison. He recommended a minimum term of thirty years to be served before parole could be considered, meaning Sutcliffe would have been unlikely to be freed until at least 2011. On 16 July 2010, the High Court issued Sutcliffe with a whole life tariff, meaning he was never to be released. After his trial, Sutcliffe admitted two other attacks. It was decided that prosecution for these offences was "not in the public interest". West Yorkshire Police made it clear that the victims wished to remain anonymous.

Criticism of authorities

West Yorkshire Police 
West Yorkshire Police was criticised for being inadequately prepared for an investigation on this scale. It was one of the largest investigations by a British police force and predated the use of computers. Information on suspects was stored on handwritten index cards. Aside from difficulties in storing and accessing the paperwork (the floor of the incident room was reinforced with concrete pillars to cope with the weight of the paper), it was difficult for officers to overcome the information overload of such a large manual system. 

Sutcliffe was interviewed nine times, but all information the police had about the case was stored in paper form, making cross-referencing difficult, compounded by television appeals for information which generated thousands more documents. The 1982 Byford Report into the investigation concluded: "The ineffectiveness of the major incident room was a serious handicap to the Ripper investigation. While it should have been the effective nerve centre of the whole police operation, the backlog of unprocessed information resulted in the failure to connect vital pieces of related information. This serious fault in the central index system allowed Peter Sutcliffe to continually slip through the net".

The choice of Oldfield to lead the inquiry was criticised by Byford: "The temptation to appoint a 'senior man' on age or service grounds should be resisted. What is needed is an officer of sound professional competence who will inspire confidence and loyalty". He found wanting Oldfield's focus on the hoax tape and his ignoring advice from survivors of Sutcliffe's attacks and several eminent specialists, including from the FBI in the United States, along with dialect analysts such as Stanley Ellis and Jack Windsor Lewis, that "Wearside Jack" was a hoaxer. The investigation used the hoax tape as a point of elimination rather than a line of enquiry and allowed Sutcliffe to avoid scrutiny, as he did not fit the profile of the sender of the tape or letters. The "Wearside Jack" hoaxer was given unusual credibility when analysis of saliva on the envelopes he sent showed he had the same blood group as that which Sutcliffe had left at crime scenes, a type shared by only 6% of the population. Humble, the hoaxer, appeared to know details of the murders which had not been released to the press, but which in fact he had acquired from pub gossip and his local newspaper.

In response to the police reaction to the murders, the Leeds Revolutionary Feminist Group organised a number of 'Reclaim the Night' marches. The group and other feminists had criticised the police for victim-blaming, especially for the suggestion that women should remain indoors at night. Eleven marches in various towns across the United Kingdom took place on the night of 12 November 1977, making the point that women should be able to walk anywhere without restriction and that they should not be blamed for men's violence.

In 1988, the mother of Sutcliffe's last victim, Jacqueline Hill, during an action for damages on behalf of her daughter's estate, argued in the case Hill v Chief Constable of West Yorkshire in the High Court that the police had failed to use reasonable care in apprehending Sutcliffe. The House of Lords held that the Chief Constable of West Yorkshire did not owe a duty of care to the victim due to the lack of proximity, and therefore failing on the second limb of the Caparo test. 

After Sutcliffe's death in November 2020, West Yorkshire Police issued an apology for the "language, tone, and terminology" used by the force at the time of the original investigation, nine months after one of the victims' sons wrote on behalf of several of the victims' families.

Attitude towards prostitutes 
The attitude in the West Yorkshire Police at the time reflected Sutcliffe's own misogyny and sexist attitudes, according to multiple sources. Jim Hobson, a senior West Yorkshire detective, told a press conference in October 1979 the perpetrator: "...has made it clear that he hates prostitutes. Many people do. We, as a police force, will continue to arrest prostitutes. But the Ripper is now killing innocent girls. That indicates your mental state and that you are in urgent need of medical attention. You have made your point. Give yourself up before another innocent woman dies".Joan Smith wrote in Misogynies (1989, 1993), that "even Sutcliffe, at his trial, did not go quite this far; he did at least claim he was demented at the time".

At Sutcliffe's trial in 1981, Attorney-General Sir Michael Havers QC said of Sutcliffe's victims in his opening statement: "Some were prostitutes, but perhaps the saddest part of the case is that some were not. The last six attacks were on totally respectable women". This drew condemnation from the English Collective of Prostitutes (ECP), who protested outside the Old Bailey. Nina Lopez, who was one of the ECP protestors in 1981, told The Independent forty years later, Havers' comments were "an indictment of the whole way in which the police and the establishment were dealing with the Yorkshire Ripper case".

Byford report 

The Inspector of Constabulary Lawrence Byford's 1981 report of an official inquiry into the Ripper case was not released by the Home Office until 1 June 2006. The sections "Description of suspects, photofits and other assaults" and parts of the section on Sutcliffe's "immediate associates" were not disclosed by the Home Office.

The Byford Report's major findings were contained in a summary published by the Home Secretary, William Whitelaw, the first time precise details of the bungled police investigation had been disclosed. Byford described delays in following up vital tip-offs from Trevor Birdsall, who on 25 November 1980 sent an anonymous letter to police, the text of which ran as follows: 

Birdsall's letter was marked "Priority No. 1". An index card was created on the basis of the letter and a policewoman found Sutcliffe already had three existing index cards in the records. But "for some inexplicable reason", said the Byford Report, the papers remained in a filing tray in the incident room until Sutcliffe's arrest on 2 January 1981, the following year.

Birdsall visited Bradford police station the day after sending the letter to repeat his suspicions about Sutcliffe. He added that he was with Sutcliffe when he got out of a car to pursue a woman with whom he had had an argument at a bar in Halifax on 16 August 1975  the date and place of the Olive Smelt attack. A report compiled on the visit was lost, despite a "comprehensive search" which took place after Sutcliffe's arrest, according to the Byford Report. Byford said:

Investigations into other possible victims

Byford 
Amongst other things, the Byford Report asserted that there was a high likelihood of Sutcliffe having claimed more victims both during and before his known killing spree. Referring to the period between 1969, when Sutcliffe first came to the attention of police, and 1975, the year of his first documented murder, the report states: "There is a curious and unexplained lull in Sutcliffe's criminal activities" and "it is my firm conclusion that between 1969 and 1980 Sutcliffe was probably responsible for many attacks on unaccompanied women, which he has not yet admitted, not only in the West Yorkshire and Manchester areas, but also in other parts of the country". 

In 1969, Sutcliffe, described in the Byford Report as an "otherwise unremarkable young man", came to the notice of police on two occasions over incidents with prostitutes. Later that year, in September 1969, he was arrested in Bradford's red light area for being in possession of a hammer, an offensive weapon, but he was charged with "going equipped for stealing" as it was assumed he was a potential burglar. The report said that it was clear Sutcliffe had on at least one occasion attacked a Bradford prostitute with a cosh.

Byford's report states:
 Police identified a number of attacks which matched Sutcliffe's modus operandi and tried to question the killer, but he was never charged with other crimes.

Carol Wilkinson case

Only days after Sutcliffe's conviction in 1981, crime writer David Yallop asserted that he may have been responsible for the murder of Carol Wilkinson, who was randomly bludgeoned over the head with a stone in Bradford on 10 October 1977, nine days after his killing of Jean Jordan. Wilkinson's murder had initially been considered as a possible "Ripper" killing, but this was quickly ruled out as she was not a prostitute. Police eventually admitted in 1979 that the Ripper did not solely attack prostitutes, but by this time a local man, Anthony Steel, had already been convicted of Wilkinson's murder. 

Yallop highlighted that Steel had always protested his innocence and been convicted on weak evidence. He had confessed to the murder under intense questioning, having been told that he would be allowed to see a solicitor if he did so. Even though his confession failed to include any details of the murder, and Ripper detective Jim Hobson testified at trial that he did not find the confession credible, Steel was narrowly convicted. 

Around the time of Wilkinson's murder it was widely reported that Professor David Gee, the Home Office pathologist who conducted all the post-mortem examinations on the Ripper victims, noted similarities between the Wilkinson murder and the killing of Ripper victim Yvonne Pearson three months later. Like Wilkinson, Pearson was bludgeoned with a heavy stone and was not stabbed, and was initially ruled out as a "Ripper" victim. Pearson's murder was re-classified as a Ripper killing in 1979, while Wilkinson's murder was not reviewed. Sutcliffe did not confess to Wilkinson's murder at his trial, although by this time Steel was already serving time for the murder. During his imprisonment, Sutcliffe was noted to show "particular anxiety" at mentions of Wilkinson due to the possible unsoundness of Steel's conviction.

Sutcliffe was known to be acquaintances with Wilkinson, and was known to have argued violently with Wilkinson's stepfather over his advances towards her. He was familiar with the council estate where she was murdered and was known to have regularly frequented the area; in February 1977, only months before the murder, he was reported to police for acting suspiciously on the street where Wilkinson lived. Furthermore, earlier on the day as Wilkinson's murder, Sutcliffe had gone back to mutilate Jordan's body before returning to Bradford, showing he had already gone out to attack victims that day and would have been in Bradford to attack Wilkinson after he returned from mutilating Jordan. The location Wilkinson was killed was very close to Sutcliffe's place of employment at T. & W. H. Clark, where he would have clocked in for work that afternoon.

In 2003, Steel's conviction was quashed after it was found that his low IQ and mental capabilities made him a vulnerable interviewee, discrediting his supposed "confession" and confirming Yallop's long-standing suspicions that he had been wrongfully convicted. Yallop continued to put forth the theory that Sutcliffe was the real killer. In 2015, former detective Chris Clark and investigative journalist Tim Tate published a book, Yorkshire Ripper: The Secret Murders (see below), which supported the theory that Sutcliffe had murdered Wilkinson, pointing out that her body had been posed and partially stripped in a manner similar to the Ripper's modus operandi. In 2022, ITV broadcast a documentary based on Clark and Tate's book which discussed links between Wilkinson's murder and Sutcliffe.

Keith Hellawell investigations 

In 1982, West Yorkshire Police appointed detective Keith Hellawell to lead a secret investigation into possible additional murders committed by Sutcliffe. A list was compiled of around sixty murders and attempted murders. Detectives were able to eliminate Sutcliffe from forty of these cases with reference to his lorry driver's logs, leaving twenty-two unsolved crimes with hallmarks of a Ripper attack which were investigated further. Twelve of these occurred within West Yorkshire, while the others took place in other parts of the country.

One of the cases investigated was an attack on Bradford student teacher Gloria Wood in November 1974, in which Wood was attacked as she walked home one evening by a man who had asked if she needed help carrying her bags.

Another noteworthy case was the April 1977 murder of 18-year-old Debbie Schlessinger, who was killed as she walked home one evening in Leeds after a night out. Within yards of her home she was stabbed randomly by a man with dark hair and a beard, and there was no clear motive. Although a hammer was not used, Sutcliffe also often used a knife to stab his victims. Most notably, Sutcliffe's work record also showed that he was delivering to an engineering plant 100 yards from Schlessinger's home on the day she was killed. The killing took place only two days before Sutcliffe's known killing of Patricia Atkinson in Bradford. At the time detectives did not believe Schlessinger's murder was a Ripper killing as she was not a prostitute. However, by 2002 West Yorkshire Police publicly announced they were ready to bring charges against Sutcliffe for this murder (although no further action was taken as his whole-life tariff was confirmed). At this time police also announced they were ready to bring charges against Sutcliffe for another attack on a woman who was listed as a possible Ripper victim by Hellawell, Mo Lea, who had been attacked with a hammer in Leeds in October 1980 by a man matching Sutcliffe's description. A month later Sutcliffe would kill Jacquline Hill only a mile away from the scene of Lea's attack.

Another suspected victim of Sutcliffe was Yvonne Mysliwiec, a 21-year-old student attacked by a man with a ball-peen hammer at Ilkley train station in October 1979. She survived the attack with serious injuries as a man distrupted the attacker, who matched Sutcliffe's description. There were also two men on Hellawell's list of possible victims. One of these was Fred Craven, a bookkeeper murdered with a hammer on the same street Sutcliffe lived on in Bingley in 1966, and whose daughter Sutcliffe was known to have approached and been rejected by. Witnesses saw a man running from the scene wearing a Donovan hat, one of which Sutcliffe was known to have owned, but police never interviewed him at the time. The other male listed as a possible victim was John Tomey, who was attacked by a hammer by a man who matched Sutcliffe's description in his taxi in 1967.

Hellewell had listed the attacks on Tracey Browne in 1975 and Ann Rooney in 1979 as possible Sutcliffe attacks, and it was to him he confessed to these crimes to in 1992, confirming police suspicions that he was responsible for more attacks than those he confessed to at trial. Hellawell also included six unsolved murder cases in Scotland on his list, and Sutcliffe was reportedly interviewed in prison about a number of murders in Scotland. These included the murders of prostitute Carol Lannen and trainee nursery nurse Elizabeth McCabe in Dundee in 1979 and 1980 respectively, which together became known as the "Templeton Woods murders" due to their bodies being found only 150 yards apart in Templeton Woods in the city. The murder of teenager Mary Gallagher in Glasgow in 1978 was also believed to be included on Hellawell's list of possible victims, and he was said to be taking that case "very seriously". 

Also believed to be included on the list were the murders of 20-year-old Anna Kenny, 36-year-old Hilda McAuley and 23-year-old Agnes Cooney in separate incidents in Glasgow in 1977, as well as the World's End murders of Helen Scott and Christine Eadie in Edinburgh in 1978. However, some of the links between Sutcliffe and these cases would later be definitively disproven. In 2001, Angus Sinclair was convicted of the murder of Mary Gallagher on DNA evidence, and he was also convicted of the World's End murders in 2014 in a highly publicised trial. Sinclair is also the prime suspect in the murders of Kenny, McAuley and Cooney, but detectives felt they did not have enough evidence to charge him before his death in prison in 2019. The murder of Hila McAuley could also be definitively proven not to have been committed by Sutcliffe it has occurred on the same night he killed Jean Jordan in Manchester. 

In 2007 a man was tried for the murder of Elizabeth McCabe after a 1 in 40 million DNA match was found between his DNA and samples found on the victim's clothing, but he was found not guilty by a majority verdict at the conclusion of the trial. 

Other links made by police between unsolved attacks and Sutcliffe would also be subsequently disproven. For some time the 1970 murder of hitch-hiker Barbara Mayo was listed as a possible Sutcliffe attack by investigators, but this was conclusively disproved by DNA in 1997. Investigators had taken DNA from Sutcliffe at Broadmoor Hospital in December 1997 in order to see if they could find links between him and unsolved crimes.

Other police investigations 
Other forces across Britain also investigated links between Sutcliffe and unsolved murders in their force area. In August 1979 a prostitute, 32-year-old Wendy Jenkins, was killed in Bristol, and Avon and Somerset Police liaised with West Yorkshire Police about whether there was any potential links to the "Ripper" killing spree. Ripper detective Jim Hobson duly visited the site of the murder in Bristol, but there were a number of differences from Sutcliffe's known modus operandi. Jenkins' murder remains unsolved. 

After his conviction in 1981, South Yorkshire Police interviewed Sutcliffe on the murder of 29-year-old Doncaster prostitute Barbara Young, who had been hit over the head by a "tall, dark haired man" in an alleyway on the evening of 22 March 1977. However, several aspects of the attack did not fit Sutcliffe's modus operandi, particularly as she had been hit from the front and had been the victim of a robbery. South Yorkshire Police also interviewed Sutcliffe on the murder of Ann Marie Harold in Mexborough in 1980, but links to him were later disproved when another man was convicted of her murder in 1982. 

For many years Sutcliffe was linked in the press to the murder of 42-year-old Marion Spence in Leeds on 10 June 1979, but a man had in fact been convicted of her murder in January 1980. Links were also made between Sutcliffe and the murder of 38-year-old Mary Gregson in Shipley in August 1977, but Sutcliffe was ruled out after a DNA profile of the killer was extracted in 1999, and another man was convicted of the killing in 2000. Sutcliffe was also linked to the 1975 murder of Lesley Molseed after a man was found to have been wrongly imprisoned for the crime in 1992, but Ronald Castree was convicted of her murder after a DNA match in 2007. Detectives had been able to compare Sutcliffe's DNA with the killer's in order to eliminate him from the inquiry.

Yorkshire Ripper: The Secret Murders 

In 2015, authors Chris Clark and Tim Tate published a book claiming links between Sutcliffe and unsolved murders, titled Yorkshire Ripper: The Secret Murders. It alleged that, between 1966 and 1980, Sutcliffe was responsible for at least twenty-two more murders than he was convicted of. The book was later adapted into a two-part ITV documentary series of the same name, which featured both Clark and Tate. 

Clark and Tate claimed there were links between Sutcliffe and unsolved murders across the country, such as that of Jacqueline Ansell-Lamb and Barbara Mayo, Judith Roberts, Wendy Sewell, Eve Stratford and Lynne Weedon, Patsy Morris and Carol Wilkinson. As part of the research for the book, the authors claimed to have found evidence that pointed to the wrong man having been convicted for the Sewell murder, having unearthed a pathology report which allegedly indicated that the originally convicted Stephen Downing could not have committed the crime. The Home Office responded by stating that it would send any new evidence to the police. Derbyshire Constabulary dismissed the theory, pointing to the fact that a reinvestigation in 2002 had found only that Downing couldn't be ruled out of the investigation and stating that there was no evidence linking Sutcliffe to the crime.

A number of murders Clark and Tate claimed could be linked to Sutcliffe already have DNA evidence, such as the murders of Mayo, Stratford and Weedon, and investigators are known to already have a copy of Sutcliffe's DNA and have been able to rule him out of unsolved cases as a result. Mayo was already ruled out as a Sutcliffe victim by police in 1997, and the DNA sample in her case has not been linked by police to that of Weedon or Stratford, showing the murders were committed by different people. Upon Sutcliffe's death in 2020, Clark submitted a Freedom of Information request to the Home Office, asking if Sutcliffe's DNA was on the national DNA database. The Home Office confirmed that it was, indicating that Sutcliffe can be ruled out of unsolved murder cases in which there is existing DNA evidence such as in the Mayo, Stratford and Weedon cases. These cases did not feature in the 2022 documentary version of Clark's book.

Clark and Tate claimed that Sutcliffe could have been in Essex and still had enough time to drive back to Bradford to kill Leach six and a half hours later. One supposedly "unsolved" murder linked to Sutcliffe in The Secret Murders, that of Marion Spence in Leeds in 1979, had in fact already been solved in January 1980 when a man was convicted of her murder.

Custody

Prison and Broadmoor Hospital 
Following his conviction and incarceration, Sutcliffe chose to use the name Coonan, his mother's maiden name. He began his sentence at HM Prison Parkhurst on 22 May 1981. Despite being found sane at his trial, Sutcliffe was diagnosed with paranoid schizophrenia. Attempts to send him to a secure psychiatric unit were blocked. 

While at Parkhurst he was seriously assaulted by James Costello, a 35-year-old career criminal with several convictions for violence. On 10 January 1983, he followed Sutcliffe into the recess of F2, the hospital wing at Parkhurst, and plunged a broken coffee jar twice into the left side of Sutcliffe's face, creating four wounds requiring thirty stitches. In March 1984, Sutcliffe was sent to Broadmoor Hospital, under Section 47 of the Mental Health Act 1983.

Sutcliffe's wife obtained a separation around 1989 and a divorce in July 1994. On 23 February 1996, he was attacked in his room in Broadmoor's Henley Ward. Paul Wilson, a convicted robber, asked to borrow a videotape before attempting to strangle Sutcliffe with the cable from a pair of stereo headphones.

After an attack with a pen by fellow inmate Ian Kay on 10 March 1997, Sutcliffe lost the vision in his left eye, and his right eye was severely damaged. Kay admitted trying to kill Sutcliffe and was ordered to be detained in a secure mental hospital without limit of time. In 2003, it was reported that Sutcliffe had developed diabetes.

Sutcliffe's father died in 2004 and was cremated. On 17 January 2005 he was allowed to visit Arnside where the ashes had been scattered. The decision to allow the temporary release was initiated by David Blunkett and ratified by Charles Clarke when he became Home Secretary. Sutcliffe was accompanied by four members of the hospital staff. The visit led to front-page tabloid headlines.

On 22 December 2007, Sutcliffe was attacked by fellow inmate Patrick Sureda, who lunged at him with a metal cutlery knife while shouting, "You fucking raping, murdering bastard, I'll blind your fucking other one!" Sutcliffe flung himself backwards and the blade missed his right eye, stabbing him in the cheek.

On 17 February 2009, it was reported that Sutcliffe was "fit to leave Broadmoor". On 23 March 2010, the Secretary of State for Justice, Jack Straw, was questioned by Julie Kirkbride, Conservative MP for Bromsgrove, in the House of Commons seeking reassurance for a constituent, a victim of Sutcliffe, that he would remain in prison. Straw responded that whilst the matter of Sutcliffe's release was a parole board matter, "that all the evidence that I have seen on this case, and it's a great deal, suggests to me that there are no circumstances in which this man will be released".

Appeal 
An application by Sutcliffe for a minimum term to be set, offering the possibility of parole after that date if it were thought safe to release him, was heard by the High Court on 16 July 2010. The court decided that Sutcliffe would never be released. Mr Justice Mitting stated:

Psychological reports describing Sutcliffe's mental state were taken into consideration, as was the severity of his crimes. Sutcliffe spent the rest of his life in custody. On 4 August 2010, a spokeswoman for the Judicial Communications Office confirmed that Sutcliffe had initiated an appeal against the decision. The hearing for Sutcliffe's appeal against the ruling began on 30 November 2010 at the Court of Appeal. The appeal was rejected on 14 January 2011. On 9 March 2011, the Court of Appeal rejected Sutcliffe's application for leave to appeal to the Supreme Court.

Later events 
In December 2015, Sutcliffe was assessed as being "no longer mentally ill". In August 2016, a medical tribunal ruled that he no longer required clinical treatment for his mental condition, and could be returned to prison. Sutcliffe was reported to have been transferred from Broadmoor to HM Prison Frankland in August 2016.

In 2017, West Yorkshire Police launched Operation Painthall to determine if Sutcliffe was guilty of unsolved crimes dating back to 1964. This inquiry also looked at the killings of two prostitutes in southern Sweden in 1980. Given that Sutcliffe was a lorry driver, it was theorised that he had been in Denmark and Sweden, making use of the ferry across the Oresund Strait. In December 2017 West Yorkshire Police, in response to a Freedom of Information request, neither confirmed nor denied that Operation Painthall existed. West Yorkshire Police later stated that it was "absolutely certain" that Sutcliffe had never been in Sweden.

Death 
Sutcliffe died at University Hospital of North Durham aged 74 on 13 November 2020, after having previously returned to HMP Frankland following treatment for a suspected heart attack at the same hospital two weeks prior. He had a number of underlying health problems, including obesity and diabetes. He reportedly refused treatment. A private funeral ceremony was held, and Sutcliffe's body was cremated.

Media 
The song "Night Shift" by English post-punk band Siouxsie and the Banshees on their 1981 album Juju is about Sutcliffe.

On 6 April 1991, Sutcliffe's father, John Sutcliffe, talked about his son on the television discussion programme After Dark.

This Is Personal: The Hunt for the Yorkshire Ripper, a British television crime drama miniseries, first shown on ITV from 26 January to 2 February 2000, is a dramatisation of the real-life investigation into the murders, showing the effect that it had on the health and career of Assistant Chief Constable George Oldfield (Alun Armstrong). The series also starred Richard Ridings and James Laurenson as DSI Dick Holland and Chief Constable Ronald Gregory, respectively. Although broadcast over two weeks, two episodes were shown consecutively each week. The series was nominated for the British Academy Television Award for Best Drama Serial at the 2001 awards.

The 13 May 2013 episode of Crimes That Shook Britain focused on the case.

On 26 August 2016, the police investigation was the subject of BBC Radio 4's The Reunion. Sue MacGregor discussed the investigation with John Domaille, who later became assistant chief constable of West Yorkshire Police; Andy Laptew, who was a junior detective who interviewed Sutcliffe; Elaine Benson, who worked in the incident room and interviewed suspects; David Zackrisson, who investigated the "Wearside Jack" tape and letters in Sunderland; and Christa Ackroyd, a local journalist in Halifax.

A three-part series of one-hour episodes, The Yorkshire Ripper Files: A Very British Crime Story, by filmmaker Liza Williams aired on BBC Four in March 2019. This included interviews with some of the victims, their family, police and journalists who covered the case. In the series she questions whether the attitude of both the police and society towards women prevented Sutcliffe from being caught sooner. On 31 July 2020, the series won the BAFTA prize for Specialist Factual TV programming.

A play written by Olivia Hirst and David Byrne, The Incident Room, premiered at Pleasance as part of the 2019 Edinburgh Festival Fringe. The play focuses on the police force hunting Sutcliffe. The play was produced by New Diorama.

The third book (and second episodic television adaptation) in David Peace's Red Riding series is set against the backdrop of the Ripper investigation. In that episode, Sutcliffe is played by Joseph Mawle.

In October 2020, it was announced that ITV was to produce a new six-part drama series about the Ripper. To be titled The Long Shadow, it was expected to air in September 2022.

In December 2020, Netflix released a four-part documentary entitled The Ripper, which recounts the police investigation into the murders with interviews from living victims, family members of victims and police officers involved in the investigation.

The 2021 podcast Crime Analysis covers Sutcliffe's crimes, focusing on the victims, the investigation and forensics, trial, and aftermath including an interview with the son of victim Wilma McCann.

In November 2021, American heavy metal band Slipknot released a song titled "The Chapeltown Rag", which is inspired by the media reporting on the murders.

In February 2022, Channel 5 released a 60-minute documentary entitled The Ripper Speaks: The Lost Tapes, which recounts interviews and Sutcliffe speaking about life in prison and in Broadmoor Hospital, as well the crimes he had committed but which had not been seen or treated as "a Ripper killing".

See also 

 Gordon Cummins (Blackout Ripper)
 Anthony Hardy (Camden Ripper)
 Steve Wright (serial killer) (perpetrator of the Ipswich serial murders)
 Alun Kyte (Midlands Ripper)
 David Smith, also a murderer of sex workers
 List of prisoners with whole-life orders
 List of serial killers in the United Kingdom
 List of serial killers by number of victims
 Chris Clark, author of Yorkshire Ripper: The Secret Murders, a 2015 book claiming links between Sutcliffe and unsolved murders

Notes

References

Bibliography

External links 
  (multiple files)

 

 

 

 

1946 births
1980s trials
2020 deaths
20th-century English criminals
British people convicted of attempted murder
Chapeltown, Leeds
Crime in Manchester
Crime in West Yorkshire
Criminals from Yorkshire
Deaths from the COVID-19 pandemic in England
English male criminals
English murderers of children
English people convicted of murder
English people of Irish descent
English prisoners sentenced to life imprisonment
English serial killers
Fugitives wanted by the United Kingdom
Jack the Ripper
Male serial killers
Murder in Manchester
Murder in West Yorkshire
People convicted of murder by England and Wales
People detained at Broadmoor Hospital
People from Bingley
People with schizophrenia
 
Prisoners sentenced to life imprisonment by England and Wales
Prisoners who died from COVID-19
Prisoners who died in England and Wales detention
Serial killers who died in prison custody
Violence against women in England